The Big Show, an American radio variety program featuring 90 minutes of comic, stage, screen and music talent, was aimed at keeping American radio in its classic era robust against the rapidly growing television tide. For a good portion of its two-year run (November 5, 1950 – April 20, 1952), the show's quality made its ambition seem plausible.

Personalities
Hosted by stage actress Tallulah Bankhead, The Big Show began November 5, 1950, on NBC with a stellar line-up of guests: Fred Allen, Mindy Carson, Jimmy Durante, José Ferrer, Portland Hoffa, Frankie Laine, Russell Knight, Paul Lukas, Ethel Merman, Danny Thomas and Meredith Willson. To make sure no one missed the launch, NBC ran in Sunday newspapers across the country an illustrated advertisement displaying headshots of Allen, Bankhead, Carson, Durante and Merman. The premiere opened with this introduction:
Tallulah Bankhead: This is radio, 1950. The greatest stars of our time on one big program. And the most fabulous part about this, dahlings, is that every Sunday, we will present other stars of the same magnitude. Ah, pardon me if I sound like a name dropper, but, ah just listen to three or four of the names we've lined up for next week's show: Groucho Marx, Fanny Brice, Jane Powell and Ezio Pinnnn-za! (Laughter) Well, now, don't just sit there with your mouths open, dahlings. I know what you're thinking: you think such a radio show every week is impossible. And I'm sure that, after you hear our first broadcast, you're going to say "that show was impossible". (Laughter) Oh, no, that doesn't sound quite right, does it? (Laughter) But NBC says nothing is impossible. All it takes is courage, vision, and a king-sized bundle of dough. Each week, there will be comedy, drama, music, all performed by the biggest stars of the time. Of course, dahlings, now and then a clinker may sneak in, but we're going to try--

Jimmy Durante: Just a minute, just a minute. I heard that last remark and I resemble it!

As she promised, on the second week's program, the guests were Groucho Marx, Jane Powell, Ezio Pinza and Fanny Brice, along with Hanley Stafford, Frank Lovejoy, David Brian and John Agar (the latter three recreating their screen roles in highlights from their current Warner Bros. picture, Breakthrough). The early shows were successful, and the program stayed on Sunday nights from 6:00-7:30pm ET for its first season, shifting to 6:30-8:00pm ET in its second. NBC went full-throttle in an attempt to keep radio from its predicted death, and The Big Show was thought to be a key to that effort. Newsweek stated it was "the biggest bang to hit radio since TV started." As if to prove big bang and big bucks were mutual partners, some $100,000 could be budgeted for a single installment.

The show's success was credited to Bankhead's notorious wit and ad-libbing ability in addition to the show's superior scripting. She had one of the funniest writers in the business on her staff: Goodman Ace, the mastermind of radio's legendary Easy Aces. She included renowned ad-libbers in the show—particularly Fred Allen (he and his longtime sidekick and wife, Portland Hoffa, appeared so often they could have been the show's regular co-hosts) and Groucho Marx, both of whom appeared on the first season's finale and appeared jointly on three other installments.

As Bankhead recorded in her memoirs, she took the show because she needed the money but nearly changed her mind when she feared she'd be little more than a glorified mistress of ceremonies with nothing to do but introduce the feature performers. "Guess what happened?" she continued. "Your heroine emerged from the fracas as the Queen of the Kilocycles. Authorities cried out that Tallulah had redeemed radio. In shepherding my charges through The Big Show, said the critics, I had snatched radio out of the grave. The autopsy was delayed."

Top talent

The show opened each week with Bankhead quietly trumpeting the high profile of each show's guests. Those guests would then introduce themselves in alphabetical order before Bankhead finished with her own unmistakable rasp, "And my name, darlings, is Tallulah Bankhead."

The show's lineup, including Allen and Marx, was a literal "who's who" of American entertainment of the time. They included film stars Ethel Barrymore, Charles Boyer, Gary Cooper, Marlene Dietrich, Douglas Fairbanks, Jr., Carmen Miranda, Bob Hope, Sam Levene, Martin and Lewis, Ginger Rogers, George Sanders, and Gloria Swanson; musical/comedy stage stars Eddie Cantor, Jimmy Durante, Judy Holliday and Gordon MacRae; opera stars Lauritz Melchior and  Robert Merrill; and, jazz and popular music titans Andrews Sisters, Louis Armstrong, Peggy Lee, Rosemary Clooney, Perry Como, Billy Eckstine, Ella Fitzgerald, Benny Goodman, The Ink Spots, Frankie Laine, Judy Garland, Édith Piaf, Frank Sinatra, Rudy Vallée and Sarah Vaughan.

The show also featured many of the nation's most familiar radio stars, some of whom were beginning to shine on the medium the show was intended to help hold at bay: Gertrude Berg (The Goldbergs), Milton Berle, Bob Cummings, Joan Davis, Ed Gardner (Archie from Duffy's Tavern), Phil Harris, Garry Moore, Jan Murray, Ozzie and Harriet Nelson (The Adventures of Ozzie and Harriet), Phil Silvers, Danny Thomas, Paul Winchell and more.

Other shows in the radio universe were referenced. The Big Show'''s November 26, 1950, installment, for example, took the cast of Bankhead, Fred Allen, Jack Carson, Melchior and Ed Wynn to the fictitious Duffy's Tavern, where Ed Gardner, in character as Archie the manager, awaited them.

Fred Allen, who frequently joked about his own radio demise, joined Bankhead in recreating one of the best-remembered routines from Allen's old show: the "Mr. and Mrs. Breakfast Show" routine that ruthlessly satirized the often saccharine husband-and-wife morning shows that became something of a radio staple a decade earlier. And it was on The Big Show's premiere that Allen delivered his famous wisecrack about TV: "Television is a new medium, and I have discovered why it's called a new medium --- because nothing is well done."

"The Big Show was not just more grand than most radio shows---it was also more witty, smoothly produced, smart, and ambitious, with an interesting juxtaposition of guests, but it wasn't significantly different," wrote radio historian Gerald Nachman in Raised on Radio. "It was just a more lavish, inflated revival of radio's earliest form---the variety showcase; you could almost hear the sequins." Yet Nachman admired the show, which he said was "as close to a Broadway show as radio could whip together each week."

Finale
Except for special tributes (the series premiere, coinciding with the anniversary of George M. Cohan's death, was a particularly slam-bang tribute: a medley of Cohan musicals' signature songs), the show usually concluded with each guest taking a turn singing a line from music director Meredith Willson's composition "May the Good Lord Bless and Keep You", a touch which proved sentimental but not saccharine. So did Bankhead's likewise customary sign-off, wishing "Godspeed" to American armed forces around the world (who also listened to the program via the Armed Forces Radio Service).

In the surviving episodes, including that first-season finale, Bankhead and her guests breeze through the comic banter and music sequences. Bankhead benefited from a first-class musical director in Willson. Ace's staff writers included Frank Wilson (who adapted movie scripts and short stories for the dramatic segments), George Foster, Mort Greene and Selma Diamond. Fred Allen, a longtime friend of Goodman Ace, contributed as well and is considered (at least by historian Nachman) to have been the show's unofficial script doctor. The show's announcers were Ed Herlihy and, when it occasionally originated from Hollywood, Jimmy Wallington.The Big Show wasn't quite big enough to put television in its place and keep it there. NBC cancelled the show after two seasons and a reported loss of $1 million, a major figure in those years. In fact, it was primarily because the program was unable to attract more advertisers than those who sustained the second half-hour segment (6:30-7:00pm) during the first season: RCA Victor, American Home Products/Whitehall Pharmacal's Anacin, and Liggett & Myers' Chesterfield cigarettes. The show's failure to pull the audience needed to keep it alive longer than two years might also have been due to the former NBC hits now nestling on rival CBS, including The Jack Benny Program (directly opposite The Big Show), Amos 'n' Andy and Edgar Bergen and Charlie McCarthy. But The Big Show is remembered as one of the great final stands, at its best, of classic American old-time radio and---for its wit, colorful music and dramatics---as good as broadcast variety programming got on either medium.

Television
Dee Englebach, producer of The Big Show, attempted to recreate the radio program's success on television with All Star Revue, and Bankhead signed on as one of the rotating hosts, essentially repeating the comedy antics and musical variety of The Big Show in front of cameras, beginning October 11, 1952, with guest line-up that included Groucho Marx, Ethel Barrymore, Ben Grauer, and Meredith Willson. She continued to host that TV series until April 18, 1953.

In the spring of 1980, a 90-minute TV series titled The Big Show, premiered on NBC. Nominated for several Emmy Awards, it nevertheless died a quick death after only a few months. Keith Olbermann's first MSNBC news show, which aired from 1997 to 1998, was titled The Big Show with Keith Olbermann.

References

Sources
Ace, Goodman. Interview with Richard Lamparski, WBAI, 1970.
Ace, Goodman. The Better of Goodman Ace. New York: Doubleday, 1971.
Bankhead, Tallulah. Tallulah. New York: Harper & Row, 1952.
Carrier, Jeffrey L. Tallulah Bankhead: A Bio-Bibliography, page 35. Westport, Connecticut: Greenwood Press, 1991.
Crosby, John. Out of the Blue. New York: Simon and Schuster, 1952.
Nachman, Gerald. Raised on Radio''. New York: Pantheon Books, 1998.

Listen to

External links
Jerry Haendiges Vintage Radio Logs: The Big Show
Philip Oliver's Tallulah: A Passionate Life
 Necrology of Old Radio Personalities
OTR Actors and Their Roles

1950s American radio programs
American comedy radio programs
American variety radio programs
NBC radio programs